Daniel Ray Ainge (born March 17, 1959) is an American former professional basketball player, coach, and professional baseball player who serves as an executive for the Utah Jazz of the National Basketball Association (NBA).

A three-sport star in high school, he was named to All-America teams in football, basketball, and baseball. At Brigham Young University, he was named national basketball college player of the year and won the John R. Wooden Award for the most outstanding male college basketball player. While in college, Ainge also played parts of three seasons with the Toronto Blue Jays of Major League Baseball (MLB), mostly as a second baseman. He was then drafted into the NBA by the Celtics. Ainge played in the NBA for 14 seasons, playing for the Celtics, Portland Trail Blazers, Sacramento Kings, and Phoenix Suns, primarily as a shooting guard. He went on to coach the Suns for three seasons before joining management of the Celtics, with whom Ainge has three NBA championships to his credit (two as a player, one as a team executive). During his playing career he appeared in the 1988 All-Star Game, and was the NBA Executive of the Year in 2008. Ainge served as the Celtics' president of basketball operations from 2003 until his retirement in 2021, when he was succeeded by incumbent head coach Brad Stevens (whom he had hired in 2014).

During his 18-year career as general manager for the Celtics he is known for making bold moves that helps the team to rebuild, clear cap space and tanking for picks making the team back to contenders in the playoffs.

Early life

Born and raised in Eugene, Oregon, Ainge was a multi-sport star at North Eugene High School. He led the Highlanders' basketball team to consecutive AAA state titles in 1976 and 1977, earning all-state honors both years, and was considered one of the top football recruits in Oregon at wide receiver. As a junior, he was named to the 1977 Parade High School All-America team, and is the only one to be a high school first team All-American in football, basketball, and baseball.

College career 
Ainge played college basketball at Brigham Young University (BYU) in Provo, Utah. He hit one of the best-known shots in the 1981 NCAA tournament, against Notre Dame in Atlanta in the Sweet Sixteen, when his coast-to-coast drive and lay-up with two seconds remaining gave the Cougars a one-point win. Ainge concluded his senior year by winning the Eastman Award, as well as the John R. Wooden Award—given to the best collegiate player in the nation. During his four-year career at BYU, Ainge was an All-American, a two-time First Team Academic All-American, the WAC Player of the Year and a four-time All-WAC selection. He concluded his college career having scored in double figures in 112 consecutive games, an NCAA record at that time.

Baseball career

Toronto Blue Jays (1979–1981) 
Ainge was selected in baseball's 1977 amateur draft by the Toronto Blue Jays. He made it to the major leagues with the Blue Jays in  while still in college. Mostly a second baseman, he played third base and outfield positions as well, hitting .220 in his baseball career with two home runs and 146 hits in 211 games. He is the second-youngest player in Blue Jays history to hit a home run, at 20 years and 77 days, surpassed only by Vladimir Guerrero, Jr.

After three years with the Blue Jays, Ainge decided to pursue a career in basketball and was chosen in the 1981 NBA draft by the Boston Celtics, who had to buy out Ainge's contract from the Blue Jays after a legal battle.

Ainge is among the 13 athletes who have played in both the National Basketball Association and Major League Baseball, along with Frank Baumholtz, Hank Biasatti, Gene Conley, Chuck Connors, Dave DeBusschere, Dick Groat, Steve Hamilton, 
Mark Hendrickson, Cotton Nash, Ron Reed, Dick Ricketts, and Howie Schultz.

Basketball career

Boston Celtics (1981–1989) 
Not everything went well for Ainge in NBA basketball at first. He had a terrible first day of practice, "shooting 0–2,547", Larry Bird wrote in his autobiography Drive: The Story of My Life. Celtics head coach Bill Fitch gave Ainge a rough time, saying his batting average was better than his shooting percentage on the basketball court. But Ainge became an important player for the Celtics teams that won NBA titles in 1984 and 1986.

Ainge played sparingly during his rookie season (1981–82), but broke into the starting lineup in his second year, averaging 9.9 points per game. However, new coach K.C. Jones moved Ainge back to the bench in his third season (1983–84), starting Gerald Henderson instead. Ainge remained an important role player off the bench, helping the Celtics defeat the rival Los Angeles Lakers in the NBA Finals that year. The Celtics traded Henderson to Seattle in the off-season, returning Ainge to the starting guard position opposite Dennis Johnson. Ainge responded by averaging 12.9 points and 5.3 assists per game in 1984–85. He remained a starter for the Celtics for most of the next five seasons. The Celtics won the championship again in 1985–86; that team is widely considered to be one of the greatest in NBA history. In 1986–87, Ainge finished second in the NBA in free throw shooting (89.7%) and third in 3-point shooting (44.3%). The following year, he made 148 3-pointers, shattering the previous NBA single-season record of 92 held by Darrell Griffith of the Utah Jazz. Ainge made his only appearance in the NBA All-Star Game that year, scoring 12 points.

Sacramento Kings (1989–1990) 
In 1989, Ainge was traded to the Sacramento Kings, along with Brad Lohaus, for young center Joe Kleine (whom the Celtics saw as a possible successor to the aging Robert Parish) and Ed Pinckney. Now a featured player on a team with no superstars, Ainge averaged 20.3 points and 6.7 assists per game in that half-season with the Kings. He scored 45 points for the Kings in a loss to the Golden State Warriors, matching a career high that he had set just a few months prior against the Philadelphia 76ers while still playing for the Celtics at that time.

Portland Trail Blazers (1990–1992) 
In 1990, Ainge was traded to the Portland Trail Blazers for Byron Irvin and draft picks. Being a native of Oregon, he was considered a hometown favorite by Blazers fans. On May 5, 1992, Ainge played an important role in the highest scoring NBA postseason game of all time, scoring 25 points and hitting multiple key shots during a 155–153 double overtime win over the Phoenix Suns. The win gave the Blazers a three games to one game lead in the Western Conference Semifinals. Ainge would go on to help the Blazers reach the 1992 NBA Finals, only to succumb to the Chicago Bulls in six games. On June 5, he scored nine points in the extra period to tie an all-time NBA record for most points in an overtime during a finals game.

Phoenix Suns (1992–1995) 
After the 1991–92 season, Ainge became a free agent. He had stated in media interviews that he ideally wanted to stay in Portland and would contact Blazers management before seriously entertaining offers from other teams. On July 1, 1992, however, Ainge signed a contract with the Phoenix Suns on his first day of free agency. Ainge averaged 11.8 points per game as the Suns went 62–20 that year and reached the NBA finals, where they lost to Michael Jordan's Bulls in six games.

On January 18, 1994, he became the second man ever to hit 900 three-point shots in NBA history (he made 1,002 three-pointers for his career), and he scored 11,964 points for an average of 11.5 points per game, 2,768 rebounds for an average of 2.7, and 4,199 assists, an average of four per game, over 1,042 NBA games.

Ainge retired after the 1994–95 season. At the time of his retirement, he had the highest personal winning percentage in NBA history among players with at least 1,000 career games, edging out Kareem Abdul-Jabbar 69.0% to 68.8%. Ainge was inducted into the Oregon Sports Hall of Fame in 1999.

Reputation
Throughout his playing career, Ainge was known as a brash, hard-nosed player who often infuriated his teammates by being a ball hog. In a 1983 playoff game against the Atlanta Hawks, he called  Tree Rollins a "sissy", whereupon Rollins elbowed Ainge in the face. Ainge tackled Rollins and the two began wrestling. Rollins bit Ainge's middle finger so hard that it required two stitches to keep the tendon together. Ainge was ejected from the contest for starting the fight. The incident prompted the headline "Tree Bites Man" on the April 25, 1983, Boston Herald. While playing for the Phoenix Suns in the 1993 season, Ainge got into a tussle with Michael Jordan at midcourt; both were given a technical foul. In a 1994 postseason game, Ainge rifled an inbounding pass at the head of Houston Rockets guard Mario Elie, striking him in the face, snapping his neck back.

Coaching career
He became head coach of the Phoenix Suns in 1996. His resignation from the Suns coaching job in 1999 was a sudden one; he cited a need to spend more time with his family. He was replaced by assistant coach Scott Skiles.

Executive career

Boston Celtics executive
In 2003, he was hired as the executive director of Basketball Operations for the Celtics. Ainge has often been controversial in his role as a Celtics executive, trading popular players such as three-time All-Star Antoine Walker (earning himself the nickname "Trader Danny") and having personality conflicts with then-head coach Jim O'Brien (which eventually led to O'Brien's departure to the Philadelphia 76ers). However, Ainge kept the support of both the Celtics' ownership group and—perhaps most importantly—legendary former head coach Red Auerbach, who was employed by the team as a "senior assistant" until his death in October 2006.

The 2006–07 Celtics finished with a 24–58 record, second-worst in the team's history. Following the season, Paul Pierce, team captain and face of the franchise, expressed frustration with the team's failures. He requested a trade to a contender if management were unable to acquire veteran talent of Pierce's caliber.

Ainge responded with two bold moves that changed the franchise's fortunes almost overnight: the 2007 trades for the Minnesota Timberwolves' Kevin Garnett and the Seattle SuperSonics' Ray Allen immediately returned the Celtics to the ranks of the NBA's elite franchises for the first time since the early 1990s. Together with Pierce, they formed a new "Big Three" and led the Celtics to the NBA's best record (66–16) during the 2007–08 season. It was the most dramatic single-season improvement in league history (42 wins more than the previous year), and it earned Ainge the NBA Executive of the Year Award.

Boston faced the Los Angeles Lakers in the 2008 NBA Finals, renewing the long rivalry between the two teams. The Celtics won the series in six games, giving the franchise its 17th NBA championship. Danny Ainge held the trophy for the first time since winning in 1986. In October 2008, after the Celtics' championship season, he was promoted to President of Basketball Operations.

On May 3, 2010, Ainge was fined $25K for tossing a towel to distract then Cleveland Cavaliers forward JJ Hickson shooting a free throw during game 2 of the Eastern Conference Semifinals.

In 2013, Ainge traded Garnett and Pierce, along with Jason Terry and D.J. White, to the Brooklyn Nets in exchange for five players plus the Nets' first-round picks in 2014, 2016 and 2018. Boston also received the rights to swap picks with Brooklyn in 2017. It is widely considered one of the most lopsided trades in league history, in favor of the Celtics.

On August 22, 2017, Ainge made another blockbuster deal, trading All-Star point guard Isaiah Thomas, as well as Jae Crowder, Ante Žižić and the rights to the Nets' 2018 first-round draft pick, to the Cleveland Cavaliers for All-Star Kyrie Irving. Eight days later, the deal also included a 2020 second round pick from the Miami Heat as compensation relating to a prior injury to Thomas.

On June 2, 2021, Ainge announced his retirement and named head coach Brad Stevens as his replacement in president of basketball operations role.

Utah Jazz executive
On December 15, 2021, Ainge was hired as the CEO of basketball operations and alternate governor of the Utah Jazz.

Other Pursuits
In 1996, Danny Ainge made his acting debut in Space Jam, playing himself. While only a brief appearance, Ainge was dubbed "The Bad Shot Guy" after catching and shooting the ball at the same time while Charles Barkley roamed the court after having his skills stolen by the Monstars.

While a player with the Suns, Ainge opened a national chain of hat stores which he has since sold. He has volunteered at a number of charitable organizations. Ainge also served as a commentator for the NBA on TNT.

Personal life
Ainge and his wife, Michelle, reside in Wellesley, Massachusetts; they have six children (Ashlee, Austin, Tanner, Taylor, Cooper and Crew). Austin Ainge is director of player personnel for the Boston Celtics and like his father, played basketball at BYU. Tanner Ainge is a Utah County Commissioner, businessman, and lawyer.

Ainge's nephew, Erik Ainge, was the starting quarterback on the football team at the University of Tennessee and was selected by the New York Jets in the 5th round of the 2008 NFL Draft. Another nephew, Jake Toolson, played the shooting guard position for BYU and recently signed an Exhibit-10 contract with the Utah Jazz.

Ainge and his family are active members of the Church of Jesus Christ of Latter-day Saints, in which Ainge served as a bishop.

Ainge had a mild heart attack in 2009,
and another in 2019. He has ADHD, according to a personality test he took when Doc Rivers was coaching the Celtics.

NBA career statistics

Regular season

|-
| style="text-align:left;"| 
| style="text-align:left;"| Boston
| 53 || 1 || 10.6 || .357 || .294 || .862 || 1.1 || 1.6 || 0.7 || 0.1 || 4.1
|-
| style="text-align:left;"| 
| style="text-align:left;"| Boston
| 80 || 76 || 25.6 || .496 || .172 || .742 || 2.7 || 3.1 || 1.4 || 0.1 || 9.9
|-
|  style="text-align:left; background:#afe6ba;"| †
| style="text-align:left;"| Boston
| 71 || 3 || 16.3 || .460 || .273 || .821 || 1.6 || 2.3 || 0.6 || 0.1 || 5.4
|-
| style="text-align:left;"| 
| style="text-align:left;"| Boston
| 75 || 73 || 34.2 || .529 || .268 || .868 || 3.6 || 5.3 || 1.6 || 0.1 || 12.9
|-
|  style="text-align:left; background:#afe6ba;"| †
| style="text-align:left;"| Boston
| 80 || 78 || 30.1 || .504 || .356 || .904 || 2.9 || 5.1 || 1.2 || 0.1 || 10.7
|-
| style="text-align:left;"| 
| style="text-align:left;"| Boston
| 71 || 66 || 35.2 || .486 || .443 || .897 || 3.4 || 5.6 || 1.4 || 0.2 || 14.8
|-
| style="text-align:left;"| 
| style="text-align:left;"| Boston
| 81 || 81 || 37.3 || .491 || .415 || .878 || 3.1 || 6.2 || 1.4 || 0.2 || 15.7
|-
| style="text-align:left;"| 
| style="text-align:left;"| Boston
| 45 || 28 || 30.0 || .460 || .374 || .891 || 3.4 || 4.8 || 1.2 || 0.0 || 15.9
|-
| style="text-align:left;"| 
| style="text-align:left;"| Sacramento
| 28 || 26 || 36.7 || .452 || .387 || .813 || 3.6 || 6.7 || 1.5 || 0.3 || 20.3
|-
| style="text-align:left;"| 
| style="text-align:left;"| Sacramento
| 75 || 68 || 36.4 || .438 || .374 || .831 || 4.3 || 6.0 || 1.5 || 0.2 || 17.9
|-
| style="text-align:left;"| 
| style="text-align:left;"| Portland
| 80 || 0 || 21.4 || .472 || .406 || .826 || 2.6 || 3.6 || 0.8 || 0.2 || 11.1
|-
| style="text-align:left;"| 
| style="text-align:left;"| Portland
| 81 || 6 || 19.7 || .442 || .339 || .824 || 1.8 || 2.5 || 0.9 || 0.2 || 9.7
|-
| style="text-align:left;"| 
| style="text-align:left;"| Phoenix
| 80 || 0 || 27.0 || .462 || .403 || .848 || 2.7 || 3.3 || 0.9 || 0.1 || 11.8
|-
| style="text-align:left;"| 
| style="text-align:left;"| Phoenix
| 68 || 1 || 22.9 || .417 || .328 || .830 || 1.9 || 2.6 || 0.8 || 0.1 || 8.9
|-
| style="text-align:left;"| 
| style="text-align:left;"| Phoenix
| 74 || 1 || 18.6 || .460 || .364 || .808 || 1.5 || 2.8 || 0.6 || 0.1 || 7.7
|- class=sortbottom
| style="text-align:center;" colspan=2| Career
| 1042 || 508 || 26.6 || .469 || .378 || .846 || 2.7 || 4.0 || 1.1 || 0.1 || 11.5
|- class="sortbottom"
| style="text-align:center;" colspan="2"| All-Star
| 1 || 0 || 19.0 || .364 || .750 || .500 || 3.0 || 2.0 || 1.0 || 0.0 || 12.0

Playoffs

|-
| style="text-align:left;"| 1982
| style="text-align:left;"| Boston
| 10 || 0 || 12.9 || .422 || .500 || .769 || 1.3 || 1.1 || 0.2 || 0.1 || 5.0
|-
| style="text-align:left;"| 1983
| style="text-align:left;"| Boston
| 7 || 7 || 28.7 || .389 || .400 || .727 || 2.0 || 3.6 || 0.7 || 0.1 || 9.4
|-
|  style="text-align:left; background:#afe6ba;"| 1984†
| style="text-align:left;"| Boston
| 19 || 0 || 13.3 || .456 || .222 || .700 || 0.8 || 2.0 || 0.5 || 0.1 || 4.8
|-
| style="text-align:left;"| 1985
| style="text-align:left;"| Boston
| 21 || 21 || 32.7 || .466 || .438 || .769 || 2.8 || 5.8 || 1.5 || 0.0 || 11.0
|-
|  style="text-align:left; background:#afe6ba;"| 1986†
| style="text-align:left;"| Boston
| 18 || 18 || 36.2 || .554 || .412 || .867 || 4.2 || 5.2 || 2.3 || 0.1 || 15.6
|-
| style="text-align:left;"| 1987
| style="text-align:left;"| Boston
| 20 || 19 || 38.1 || .487 || .438 || .861 || 2.6 || 4.6 || 1.2 || 0.2 || 14.8
|-
| style="text-align:left;"| 1988
| style="text-align:left;"| Boston
| 17 || 17 || 39.4 || .386 || .328 || .881 || 3.1 || 6.4 || 0.5 || 0.1 || 11.6
|-
| style="text-align:left;"| 1991
| style="text-align:left;"| Portland
| 16 || 0 || 17.3 || .448 || .306 || .821 || 1.8 || 1.9 || 0.8 || 0.2 || 8.0
|-
| style="text-align:left;"| 1992
| style="text-align:left;"| Portland
| 21 || 0 || 21.4 || .479 || .404 || .830 || 1.9 || 2.3 || 0.7 || 0.0 || 10.6
|-
| style="text-align:left;"| 1993
| style="text-align:left;"| Phoenix
| 24 || 0 || 24.6 || .376 || .413 || .872 || 2.5 || 2.3 || 0.5 || 0.1 || 8.1
|-
|  style="text-align:left;"| 1994
| style="text-align:left;"| Phoenix
| 10|| 0 || 23.0 || .458 || .425 || .714 || 2.3 || 2.1 || 0.6 || 0.1 || 8.6
|-
| style="text-align:left;"| 1995
| style="text-align:left;"| Phoenix
| 10 || 0 || 13.7 || .500 || .462 || .909 || 1.0 || 1.0 || 0.5 || 0.0 || 6.0
|- class=sortbottom
| style="text-align:center;" colspan=2| Career
| 193 || 82 || 26.1 || .456 || .397 || .829 || 2.3 || 3.4 || 0.9 || 0.1 || 9.9
|-

Head coaching record

|-
| style="text-align:left;"|Phoenix
| style="text-align:left;"|
|74||40||34|||| style="text-align:center;"|4th in Pacific||5||2||3||
| style="text-align:center;"|Lost in First Round
|-
| style="text-align:left;"|Phoenix
| style="text-align:left;"|
|82||56||26|||| style="text-align:center;"|3rd in Pacific||4||1||3||
| style="text-align:center;"|Lost in First Round
|-
| style="text-align:left;"|Phoenix
| style="text-align:left;"|
|50||27||23|||| style="text-align:center;"|3rd in Pacific||3||0||3||
| style="text-align:center;"|Lost in First Round
|-
| style="text-align:left;"|Phoenix
| style="text-align:left;"|
|20||13||7|||| style="text-align:center;"|(resigned)||—||—||—||—
| style="text-align:center;"|–
|- class="sortbottom"
| style="text-align:left;"|Career
| ||226||136||90|||| ||12||3||9||

See also

List of National Basketball Association career playoff 3-point scoring leaders
List of multi-sport athletes
List of National Basketball Association team presidents

References

External links

 

1959 births
Living people
All-American college men's basketball players
American expatriate baseball players in Canada
American men's basketball players
Baseball players from Oregon
Basketball coaches from Oregon
Basketball players from Oregon
Boston Celtics draft picks
Boston Celtics executives
Boston Celtics players
BYU Cougars men's basketball players
Latter Day Saints from Oregon
Major League Baseball second basemen
National Basketball Association All-Stars
National Basketball Association broadcasters
National Basketball Association general managers
Parade High School All-Americans (boys' basketball)
Phoenix Suns head coaches
Phoenix Suns players
Point guards
Portland Trail Blazers players
Sacramento Kings players
Shooting guards
Sportspeople from Eugene, Oregon
Syracuse Chiefs players
Toronto Blue Jays players
Utah Jazz executives